Richard Paul Wellens (born 26 March 1980) is an English professional football manager and former player who played as a midfielder. He is currently head coach of EFL League Two club Leyton Orient.

Wellens began his career at Manchester United before signing for Blackpool in 2000, where he went on to win promotion from League Two via the playoffs in 2001. In 2005, he left to join Oldham Athletic, where he made 87 appearances in two seasons at the club, before moving to Doncaster in 2007, becoming an instant fans' favourite by helping get the club promoted to the Championship for the first time in 50 years. After helping the club stay in the division, he moved to Leicester City, and during his time he won the club's Player of the Year in 2011. After a short loan spell with Ipswich Town, Wellens rejoined Doncaster in 2013, where he spent a further three years. Towards the end of his career, he had a short return to Oldham, before playing for Shrewsbury Town, and non-league clubs Salford City and Macclesfield Town, his final club before retiring in 2017.

Wellens' first role in management came when he returned to Oldham as first team manager from September 2017 to June 2018, when he was sacked following the club's relegation to League Two. Wellens then took over the vacant managerial position at Swindon Town in the summer of 2018, eventually leading the club to the 2019–20 League Two title on PPG during the COVID-19 pandemic. He left Swindon to manage League Two team Salford City in November 2020, but lasted less than six months in charge before being sacked, having won the rearranged 2019–20 EFL Trophy. In May 2021 Wellens became manager of Doncaster.

Club career

Manchester United
Born in Manchester, Wellens started his career at Manchester United, playing alongside the likes of Wes Brown and John O'Shea. His only first team appearance for the club was as a substitute in a 3–0 League Cup defeat to Aston Villa on 13 October 1999.

Blackpool
Frustrated at the lack of opportunities at Manchester United, he moved to Blackpool in March 2000. Wellens became an instant first team regular at the club and before long he was a fan's favourite. While at the club he helped them win promotion via winning the 2001 Football League Third Division play-off final which he played in at the Millennium Stadium. He would return to win at the Cardiff stadium two more times with Blackpool, both with the Football League Trophy; first in 2002 after scoring a crucial opening goal against Huddersfield Town in the first leg of the North Area Final, and again in 2004, the same season he was placed in the 2003–04 Football League Second Division PFA Team of the Year. He made 226 appearances with Blackpool before his move in 2005 to Oldham Athletic.

Oldham Athletic
In 2005, he left Blackpool for his local side Oldham Athletic, with Scott Vernon going the other way. This was done to bypass the 50% sell-on clause that Manchester United had added during Wellens' transfer to the Seasiders. In summer 2007, after turning down an improved contract offered by Oldham, he signed a two-year contract with fellow League One side Doncaster Rovers. Wellens made the 2004–05, 2006–07 and 2007–08 League One PFA Team of the Year. Overall, he made 101 appearances and scored 8 times for Oldham.

Doncaster Rovers
Wellens was a member of the Doncaster side that gained promotion to the Championship in 2007–08. His midfield performances brought him several individual awards, several key goals and helped the team gain promotion. His first competitive goal for Doncaster was in August 2007 in the Football League Cup with the second strike in a 4–1 victory over Lincoln City; however, this wasn't the first time he had hit the back of the net for Doncaster: in his very first appearance in a Donny shirt, Wellens chipped the ball over the opposition goalkeeper and into the net from 40 yards in a pre-season friendly against non-league Retford United. Wellens made 97 appearances, scoring 10 times, during his spell with Doncaster prior to his £1 million move to Leicester City.

Leicester City

On 7 July 2009, Wellens joined Leicester City for a potential fee of £1.2 million, signing a three-year contract. Their biggest signing of the summer, Wellens was named by the BBC Sport as the club's key player for the 2009–10 season. He made his debut in a 2–1 win over Swansea City on 8 August 2009, scoring his first goal in a 2–0 win over Middlesbrough on 2 May 2010. Wellens featured in all but three matches for Leicester in the Championship that season. He played a crucial role in Nigel Pearson's team that reached the play-offs semi-finals, where they lost to Cardiff City on penalties.

In his second season at the club, Wellens continued to play in midfield under the reign of both Paulo Sousa and Sven-Göran Eriksson. He was named Championship Player of the Month for January, and won the club's player of the year award on 3 May 2011.

During the 2011–12 season, Wellens ended the season, back under the returning Nigel Pearson, with 46 appearances in all competitions and captaining the side 19 times, but his season ended early when he suffered a cruciate knee ligament injury, ruling him out of action for six months. On 4 October, Wellens joined Ipswich Town a one-month loan deal, and returned to Leicester after an "impressive" seven game spell.

On 23 July 2013, Wellens left Leicester City by mutual consent, having played a total of 149 games and scoring 6 goals over his four seasons with them.

Return to Doncaster Rovers
On 2 August, Wellens signed a short-term contract with former club Doncaster Rovers. Having started five of Doncaster's first six games, Wellens extended his contract until January 2014.

At the end of the season, he expected to leave the club following a collapsed takeover of the club, but signed a new two-year deal at the beginning of September.

Shrewsbury Town
Wellens joined Shrewsbury Town on a free transfer in January 2016, signing an 18-month contract. Having helped Shrewsbury to safety in League One, making twelve appearances in the second half of the 2015–16 season, he was made available on a free transfer less than five months later with manager Micky Mellon unable to guarantee him first-team football. He left in August after having game time limited.

Salford City
In September 2016, Wellens signed for National League North side Salford City. He left the club in October.

Macclesfield Town
Wellens signed for National League team Macclesfield Town in November.

Managerial career

Oldham Athletic
On 4 July 2017, Wellens returned to Oldham Athletic as a first-team coach. Following the departure of John Sheridan on 25 September, Wellens was put in charge of Oldham Athletic on an caretaker basis, with his first game in charge being a 3–2 win against Peterborough United. Wellens said he was ready to be a manager, and hoped he and the club could adopt an approach for long-term success. After a five-match unbeaten run, he was appointed manager on a permanent basis on 18 October 2017 on a two-year contract, following a recommendation from Paul Scholes. He was dismissed on 8 June 2018 after Oldham's relegation to League Two. Wellens admitted it was "the right time" to part ways, and admitted he had made mistakes that he hoped to learn from for a future managerial role.

Swindon Town
On 13 November 2018, Wellens was appointed manager of League Two side Swindon Town following the sacking of Phil Brown. His first game in charge was a 4–0 home defeat to Carlisle United, described as "the worst possible start". Wellens secured his first win as manager a week later, with a goal from Elijah Adebayo giving his side a 1–0 away win to Port Vale, and his first home victory came three days later, when academy graduate Sol Pryce scored twice on his league début to help Swindon win 3–2 against Stevenage. Wellens would guide Swindon to a 13th-place finish, ending the season with a 3–1 comeback victory against Notts County, who were relegated out of the Football League for the first time in their 157-year history as a result.

In the 2019–20 season, Wellens won the League Two title with Swindon Town on PPG during the global COVID-19 pandemic after the season was called off in March.

Salford City
On 4 November 2020, Wellens was appointed as the new manager of his former club Salford City, now playing in League Two. The first game of Wellens' reign came on 7 November, with a 2–0 win against Hartlepool in the FA Cup first round at Moor Lane, courtesy of goals from Bruno Andrade and Emmanuel Dieseruvwe in extra-time. Wellens suffered his first loss as Salford manager in his first league game in charge, a 2–0 loss against Bolton Wanderers the following week. His first league win came on 21 November against Bradford City, a 3–0 league victory with two goals from Luke Burgess and another from Ian Henderson. On 13 March 2021, Wellens guided Salford to victory in the delayed 2020 EFL Trophy Final, with a 4–2 penalty shootout victory after a 0–0 draw with Portsmouth. On 22 March 2021, it was announced that he and the club had parted company by mutual consent.

Doncaster Rovers
On 17 May 2021, Wellens was appointed manager of League One club Doncaster Rovers. On 2 December 2021, Wellens was sacked by Doncaster after just 199 days in charge with the club sitting 23rd in the table with the club having picked up just thirteen points from nineteen matches.

Leyton Orient
On 9 March 2022, Wellens was appointed head coach of League Two club Leyton Orient on a two-and-a-half year deal. At the time of his appointment, Orient were sitting in 20th position, four points clear of safety with eleven matches remaining.

An unbeaten start to the 2022–23 season saw Wellens win the EFL League Two Manager of the Month award for August 2022, his side sitting top of the league with the most goals scored and fewest conceded. A 100% record across September saw Wellens win the award for the second consecutive month.

Approach and philosophy
Wellens favours his teams to play attacking football, believing long ball and defensive minded football to not be suitable to long-term success. He cites former Manchester United manager Alex Ferguson as a major influence on his approach. Using a preferred formation of 4-2-3-1, Wellens likes his teams to play out from the back and be patient, Wellens likes his player to maintain a high level of intensity, even during training sessions.

Personal life
Wellens' son, Charlie, is also a footballer who is currently contracted to Manchester United.

Career statistics
Source:

Managerial statistics

Honours

Player
Blackpool
Football League Third Division play-offs: 2001
Football League Trophy: 2001–02, 2003–04

Doncaster Rovers
Football League One play-offs: 2008
Individual
PFA Team of the Year: 2003–04 Second Division, 2006–07 League One, 2007–08 League One
Doncaster Rovers Player of the Year: 2007–08
Football League Championship Player of the Month: January 2011
Leicester City Player of the Year: 2010–11

Manager
Swindon Town
League Two: 2019–20

Salford City
EFL Trophy: 2019–20

Individual
League Two Manager of the Month: November 2019, August 2022, September 2022

References

External links

1980 births
Living people
Footballers from Manchester
English footballers
Association football midfielders
Manchester United F.C. players
Blackpool F.C. players
Oldham Athletic A.F.C. players
Doncaster Rovers F.C. players
Leicester City F.C. players
Ipswich Town F.C. players
Shrewsbury Town F.C. players
Salford City F.C. players
Macclesfield Town F.C. players
English Football League players
National League (English football) players
English football managers
Oldham Athletic A.F.C. managers
Swindon Town F.C. managers
Salford City F.C. managers
Doncaster Rovers F.C. managers
Leyton Orient F.C. managers
English Football League managers
Association football coaches